"The Bells of Notre Dame" is a song from the 1996 Disney film, The Hunchback of Notre Dame, composed by Alan Menken, with lyrics by Stephen Schwartz. It is sung at the beginning of the film by the clown-like gypsy, Clopin. It is set mainly in the key of D minor. (However, the movie is edited up a semitone, therefore playing this piece in E-flat minor.) The song bears some similarity to the poem The Bells by Edgar Allan Poe, especially the repetition of the word "bells" during the crescendo. The song is reprised at the end of the film.

Production
The origin of this song came with the controversial swap made by Disney executives of Claude Frollo from an Archdeacon to a Minister of Justice. One of the sideeffects of this was that a backstory had to be fabricated to explain what Frollo was doing caring for Quasimodo in the first place. The notion that "Frollo is encouraged by the Archdeacon of Notre Dame to raise Quasimodo as his own, to atone for killing the baby's gypsy mother" on the stairs of the church had to be explained in the opening scene of the musical, and that was the catalyst for the song's creation. Disney Voice Actors: A Biographical Dictionary explains that "the opening sequence of [the film] was originally all narration and the result was deemed too lifeless so ['The Bells of Notre Dame'] was written".

Alan Menken said "It's a really rich number and I think it's possibly the best opening number I've ever written for any project".

Visual sequence
The song details about Quasimodo's origin and serves as the film's opening credits.

During the song, Clopin tells a group of young children about the mysterious bell-ringer of Notre Dame Cathedral, described as "a tale of a man, and a monster." Twenty years earlier, a group of gypsies attempted to ferry their way into Paris and travel to the Court of Miracles (where the gypsies live), but were ambushed by Frollo and several soldiers. When the only woman amongst the gypsies is seen carrying a bundle, one of Frollo's guards attempts to confiscate it, prompting her to flee. Frollo pursues her on his horse, thinking her bundle contains stolen goods, in an intense chase through the streets that comes to a head on the steps of Notre Dame. The woman bangs on the door pleading for sanctuary, but Frollo catches up to her before anyone can answer.

Frollo grabs the bundle from her, but in doing so strikes a blow to her head with his boot, causing her to fall down onto the stone steps, breaking her neck and killing her instantly. Frollo discovers that the bundle is actually a deformed baby boy. He spots a well nearby and attempts to drown the baby he sees as a demon from Hell, but is stopped by the Archdeacon, who admonishes Frollo for killing an innocent woman on holy ground. As Frollo tries to defend his actions, the Archdeacon says that if Frollo wishes for the salvation of his immortal soul, he must raise the child as his own. Frollo reluctantly agrees on the condition that the baby remains hidden in the bell tower of Notre Dame, and gives him a cruel name; Quasimodo, which, according to Clopin, means "half-formed". Clopin ends the song with a riddle: "Who is the monster and who is the man?" The scene then shifts to 20-year-old Quasimodo ringing the bells.

Themes
The film itself, like most Disney Renaissance films, contains valuable moral information and so, in a way, can be called a "teaching story", besides being entertainment. This is one function of stories that are told to children: to give them, at least, the basic understanding of attitudes and behaviors encountered in the real world. Through the story of the song, Clopin tells the children that it is a tale of "a man and a monster". Towards the end he gives them a riddle for them to guess whilst being told the rest of the story, that being: "Who is the monster and who is the man?", thus introducing the major theme of the film. What is meant by these words is to get behind what often are merely appearances, and by doing so we get to the actual truth. This aspect of the story can be related to real life because people often make the error of mistaking appearances (that also may be false) for the real thing or for something else entirely. In this case, while in the beginning "the picture explicitly compares the queerness of Quasimodo to the righteousness of Frollo", by the end it would seem that Quasimodo is the monster due to his deformities while his master Frollo is the man due to his sleeker looks. It is implied by the end of the film, however, that it is now indeed a paradox and reversal of the statement attributed to the two personalities, not by their appearances. Singing the reprise of the song, Clopin gives a girl a new riddle: "What makes a monster and what makes a man?", stating that Quasimodo is the man because of his humble kindness and selfless bravery, while Frollo is deemed to be the monster because of his selfishness, cruelty, and intolerance.

The work Mouse Morality: The Rhetoric of Disney Animated Film by Annalee R. Ward argues that the use of a play-within-a-play technique used in this opening number "enables the filmmakers to condense some of the story, telling us the setting instead of showing it". It adds that symbolically, Clopin's puppet show is a metaphor for what Disney has done to the original source material, having "reduced it to manipulated entertainment, ala 'tragedy lite'".

Critical reception

DVD Talk says that "The Bells of Notre Dame" and "Out There" "set... a perfect tone" for the film, which fumbles later with the "Be Our Guest"-esque "A Guy Like You". Mouse Morality: The Rhetoric of Disney Animated Film says it is a "dark, emotional scene". Disney Voice Actors: A Biographical Dictionary describes the number as "one of the most potent musical openings of any Disney film". The Oxford Companion to the American Musical: Theatre, Film, and Television says the song "combines character and narrative beautifully".

See also
 The Hunchback of Notre Dame (soundtrack)

References

Songs from The Hunchback of Notre Dame (1996 film)
Disney Renaissance songs
1996 singles
Songs with music by Alan Menken
Songs written by Stephen Schwartz (composer)
1996 songs
Songs about Paris
David Ogden Stiers songs
Tony Jay songs
Song recordings produced by Alan Menken